Club Atlético Independiente's 2011–12 season is the club's 106th year of existence. Independiente this season going to play the Torneo Apertura, the Torneo Clausura, the Surugua Bank Championship, the Recopa Sudamericana, the Copa Sudamericana and the Copa Argentina.

Squad
As of March 4, 2012

Winter transfers

Summer transfers

Player statistics

Team stats
{| class="wikitable" style="text-align: center"
|-
!
!Torneo Apertura
!Torneo Clausura
!Suruga Bank Championship
!Recopa Sudamericana
!Copa Sudamericana
!Copa Argentina
|-
|align=left| Games played          || 19 || 8 || 1 || 2 || 2 || 2
|-
|align=left| Games won             || 7 || 3 || 0 || 1 || 1 || 1
|-
|align=left| Games drawn           || 6 || 0 || 1 || 0 || 0 || 0
|-
|align=left| Games lost            || 6 || 5 || 0 || 1 || 1 || 1
|-
|align=left| Goals for             || 18 || 10 || 2 || 3 || 1 || 4 
|-
|align=left| Goals against         || 17 || 14 || 2 || 4 || 2 || 2
|-
|align=left| Players used          || 35 || 23 || 16 || 16 || 23 || 22
|-
|align=left| Yellow cards          || 36 || 20 || 1 || 6 || 5 || 5
|-
|align=left| Red cards             || 2 || 2 || 0 || 0 || 1 || 0
|-

Squad stats
Updated on 31 March 2012

Disciplinary records
Last updated on 31 March 2012.

Club

Starting XI

Current technical staff

Competitions

Pre-season

Copa de Oro

Copa Provincia de Buenos Aires

Overall

Suruga Bank Championship

Recopa Sudamericana

Copa Sudamericana

Copa Argentina

Argentine Primera División

Torneo Apertura

Results summary

Results by round

Matches

Torneo Clausura

Results summary

Results by round

Matches

International cups qualification

Relegation

Updated as of games played on March 31, 2012.Source:

Notes

References

External links
 Club Atlético Independiente official web site 

Club Atlético Independiente seasons
Ind